Mila Andrić (born 1 March 1990 in Belgrade, SR Serbia, Yugoslavia) is a Serbian hurdler who specialises and holds the Serbian national record for the 400 metres hurdles.

See also
 Serbian records in athletics

References
 IAAF profile - Mila Andrić

1990 births
Living people
Serbian female hurdlers
Athletes from Belgrade